NH 113 may refer to:

 National Highway 113 (India)
 New Hampshire Route 113, United States